The Colombischlössle Archeological Museum is a museum in Freiburg im Breisgau in southwest Germany which features the prehistoric  inheritance of the High and Upper Rhine. It was founded as the Museum of Prehistory and Early History in 1983. The focus of the museum is on the human development of the High and upper Rhine from the Paleolithic Age to the Early Middle Ages.

See also 
 Colombischlössle Freiburg

References 
 Hilde Hiller: 20 Jahre Museum für Ur- und Frühgeschichte im Colombischlössle. Museum für Ur- und Frühgeschichte, Freiburg, (Breisgau) 2003.

External links

 www.freiburg.de

Archaeological museums in Germany
Buildings and structures in Freiburg im Breisgau
Tourist attractions in Freiburg im Breisgau
Museums in Baden-Württemberg